This is a list of Slivovitz producers.

By country

Australia
 Tamborine Mountain Distillery.

Bosnia and Herzegovina
 Hepok
 Prijedorčanka

Bulgaria
 Elenska Slivova (owned by the Lyaskovets winery)
 Lesidrenska Slivova
 Tetevenska Slivova (owned by Rudolf Jelínek)
 Troyanska Slivova (owned by Rudolf Jelínek)

Croatia
 Badel 1862
 Maraska

Czech Republic
 Bonfier
 Rudolf Jelínek, the most famous distillery based in the town of Vizovice
 Stock
 Žufánek, small family-run distillery known for quality products

Hungary
 Zwack

Poland
 Polmos
 Śliwowica Łącka
 Śliwowica Paschalna
 Śliwowica Podbeskidzka
 Śliwowica Strykowska
 Strykover Slivovitz

Serbia
 Akademska rakija 
 BB Klekovača 
 Belgrade Urban Distillery 
 Quburich Quality/Bojkovčanka
 Čedina rakija
 Podrum Marić/Dedina rakija
 Flores
 Gorda
 Hubert 1924
 Aleksić Prvi/ Gružanska nit 
 Jelički dukat 
 Minićeva kuća rakije 
 Destilerija Prodanović/Misija 
 Krstašica 
 Respekt
 Navip
 Braća Tomašević/Ognjena
 Primag/Paunova
 DPM Natural/Prokovača
 Podrum Lukić
 Podrum Pevac
 Braća Rajković/Potpis
 Prokupac
 Rakija iz rakije 
 Srpska trojka 
Skaska
 Stari hrast 
 Stara pesma
 Stara Sokolova
 Wolf Inter Export / Stefan Nemanja slivovitz
 Svetica
 Pod mirnim krovovima/Uteha naša
 Voćne rakije Plazinić
 Yebiga
 Zavet
 Zlatna Biserka
 Zlatna Dolina
 Zlatni Tok
 Žubor sa Kablara

Slovakia
 Bošácka pálenica (Bošácka slivovica)
 GAS Familia (Goral Slivovica 52%)
 Myjavská slivovica 52°
 Old Herold (Bošácka slivovica)
 S 52
 St. Nicolaus (Zbojnícka slivovica 52%)

Slovenia
 Budič

United States
 Black Star Farms
 Clear Creek Distillery
 Peach Street Distillers
 Stringer's Orchard

References

Slivovitz
Slivovitz